Maisons-Laffitte is a railway station in Maisons-Laffitte, a northwestern suburb of Paris, France. It is on the Paris–Le Havre railway. The rer line A passes through the station. The station has a glass entrance with blue glass and is built in red bricks. It is composed of two accessible platforms, both which are used for the rer line A.

See also
 List of stations of the Paris RER

External links

 

Réseau Express Régional stations
Railway stations in Yvelines
Railway stations in France opened in 1898